, sometimes referred to as Who Wants to Be a Millionaire?, is a Japanese quiz show based on the original program of the latter title. It premiered on Fuji Television on April 20, 2000, and aired its final episode on January 2, 2013. The show was hosted by television personality  throughout its entire run.

The main goal of the game is to win ¥10,000,000 by answering fifteen multiple-choice questions correctly. Whenever a contestant answers the fifth question correct, he is guaranteed ¥100,000. When a contestant answers the tenth question correct, he is guaranteed ¥1,000,000.

Broadcast history 
The show was broadcast every Thursday regularly from April 20, 2000 to March 29, 2007. From May 3, 2007 onward, the show was brought back for occasional specials, with the most recent one being broadcast January 2, 2013.

Super Millionaire
Super Millionaire was a spin-off of Quiz $ Millionaire. The show was broadcast twice, with the first episode raising the grand prize to ¥20 million. The series also added four new rules:

 There were only 10 questions, as opposed to the normal 15.
 Questions 1-5 had 4 choices, and 6-10 had 2 choices, meaning contestants could not use 50:50 after the 5th question.
 Contestants could not walk away on the 9th or 10th questions.
 There were no guaranteed sums.

Clock format
In 2009, the series became the first international version of Millionaire to adopt the clock format from the US version of the show. Contestants now have time limits for each question: 30 seconds each for questions 1–9, 1 minute each for questions 10–12, and 3 minutes each for questions 13–15. Usage of lifelines temporarily pauses the clock. However, unlike the US version, the remaining time after giving an answer for that question is void. Contestants who exceed the time limit on a given question without giving a "final answer" are forced to walk away with whatever winnings they have at that point.

Payout Structure
Answering a question correctly is worth a specific cash prize at each level. Contestants who successfully answer questions on levels with bolded amounts in the table below are guaranteed to leave with no less than the cash award at that level should they incorrectly answer a later question.

Top prize winners

Civilians

Celebrities

Kids

Merchandise
Several home versions have been released based on the show. The first of these was a board game released in 2001 by Takara Tomy, who later released another electronic version of the game. A version for the PlayStation game console was released on December 20, 2001, with an updated party version released for the same console in 2002. A book entitled , was released by Fusosha on March 20, 2002.

In addition, Visiware and Sony Pictures Television have released an app based on the program's format for iOS and Android devices. Mino introduced the app during the special that aired on January 2, 2013. The app allows home viewers to play the game simultaneously, being asked the same questions featured on the show.

References

External links
 

Fuji TV original programming
Japanese game shows
Quiz shows
Who Wants to Be a Millionaire?
2000 Japanese television series debuts
2013 Japanese television series endings
2010s Japanese television series